Bothnian Sea National Park is a national park in Finland. It was established in early 2011. Around 98% of the surface of the National Park consists of water.

References

External links

 

Protected areas established in 2011
Geography of Southwest Finland
Geography of Satakunta
Tourist attractions in Southwest Finland
Tourist attractions in Satakunta
Gulf of Bothnia
National parks of Finland